State Route 175 (SR-175) is a state highway in the U.S. state of Utah. Also known as 11400 South, it spans  in southern Salt Lake County, connecting two major north-south transportation corridors in the area: the Bangerter Highway (SR-154) to the west in South Jordan, and Interstate 15 and State Street to the east.

Route description
State Route 175 begins in the city of South Jordan classified as a minor arterial road, providing access to the Daybreak Community and the Oquirrh Mountain Utah Temple from the Bangerter Highway. From here, it travels east, crossing SR-68 (Redwood Road) and the Jordan River. After crossing the river, it leaves South Jordan and continues east along the border between Sandy to the north and Draper to the south, travelling under Interstate 15 via a diamond interchange and ending less than  later at US-89 (State Street).

History
The combination of the construction of the Daybreak Community and Oquirrh Mountain Utah Temple near the west end of 11400 South, the Interstate 15 interchange at 11400 South, and the "underdeveloped State Highway System for the east west corridors in the south end of the Salt Lake Valley", led the Utah Department of Transportation to designate 11400 South as a Utah State Route 175 in 2008.

Major intersections

References

 175
175
State Route 175